Silver Jubilee Medal (Bengali: রজত জয়ন্তী পদক), is a military medal of Bangladesh. The medal was established in 1996 in honor of the 25th anniversary of the proclamation of independence.

References 

Military awards and decorations of Bangladesh